The Vasco da Gama Bridge is a cable-stayed bridge flanked by viaducts that spans the Tagus River in Parque das Nações in Lisbon, the capital of Portugal. It is the second longest bridge in Europe, after the Crimean Bridge, the longest one in the European Union. It was built to alleviate the congestion on Lisbon's 25 de Abril Bridge, and eliminate the need for traffic between the country's northern and southern regions to pass through the capital city.

Construction began in February 1995; the bridge was opened to traffic on 29 March 1998, just in time for Expo 98, the World's Fair that celebrated the 500th anniversary of the discovery by Vasco da Gama of the sea route from Europe to India.

Along with the 25 de Abril Bridge, the Vasco da Gama is one of two bridges that span the Tagus River in Lisbon.

Description

The number of road lanes will be enlarged to eight when traffic reaches a daily average of 52,000.

Bridge and access road sections
North access roads: 
North viaduct: 
Expo viaduct: ; 12 sections
Main bridge: main span: ; side spans:  each; cement pillars: -high; free height for navigation in high tides: ;
South viaduct: ;  sections; 84 sections; 85 pillars
South access roads: ; includes the toll plaza (18 gates) and two service areas

Construction and cost
The $1.1 billion project was split into four parts, each built by a different company, and supervised by an independent consortium. There were up to 3,300 workers simultaneously on the project, which took 18 months of preparation and 18 months of construction. The financing is via a build-operate-transfer system by Lusoponte, a private consortium that receives the first 40 years of tolls for both Lisbon bridges. Lusoponte's capital is 50.4% from Portuguese companies, 24.8% from French, and 24.8% from British.

Environmental pressure throughout the project resulted in the left-bank viaducts being extended inland to preserve the marshes underneath, as well as the lamp posts throughout the bridge being tilted inwards so as not to cast light on the river below.

Toll
Northbound traffic (to Lisbon) is charged a toll while traveling southbound is free. Tolls are collected through a toll plaza located on the south bank of Tagus, near Montijo. As of 2020, taxes range from €2.85 (passenger cars) to €12.20 (trucks).

See also 
 25 de Abril Bridge
 Lezíria Bridge
 List of bridges by length
 Megaproject

Notes

References

Sources
 www.civilium.net

External links

Vasco da Gama Bridge on bridge-info.org
 Portal das Nações Discover the Ponte Vasco da Gama
BBC news story of bridge opening
Flickr photos of bridge

Cable-stayed bridges in Portugal
Bridges over the Tagus
Bridges completed in 1998
Toll bridges in Portugal
Buildings and structures in Lisbon District
Buildings and structures in Setúbal District
Parque das Nações
Bridges in Lisbon
1998 establishments in Portugal